Pallasovsky District is an administrative district (raion), one of the thirty-three in Volgograd Oblast, Russia. As a municipal division, it is incorporated as Pallasovsky Municipal District. It is located in the east of the oblast. Its administrative center is the town of Pallasovka. Population:  47,347 (2002 Census);  The population of Pallasovka accounts for 37.1% of the district's total population.

References

Notes

Sources

Districts of Volgograd Oblast